The Agricultural Democratic Party was a political party in Greece in the 1930s.

History
The party first contested national elections in January 1936, winning a single seat in the Hellenic Parliament with 1% of the vote.

The 1936 elections were the last before World War II as a dictatorial regime took power in August, and the party did not return to contest elections following the war.

References

Defunct political parties in Greece
Agrarian parties in Greece
Defunct agrarian political parties